Bozgüney may refer to:

Bozgüney, Adana, a town in Adana Province, Turkey 
 Bozgüney, Lachin, a village in Lachin Rayon, Azerbaijan 

Turkish-language surnames